Humphreys may refer to:

Places
Benjamin G. Humphreys Bridge, Arkansas-Mississippi
Camp Humphreys, U.S. Camp in South Korea
Humphreys, Missouri
Humphreys County, Mississippi
Humphreys County, Tennessee
Humphreys County Airport, Tennessee
Humphreys County School District, Mississippi
Humphreys National Forest, Virginia
Humphreys Peak, the highest point in Arizona
Humphreys Station, California
Mount Humphreys, a peak in the Sierra Nevada

Other uses

Humphreys (surname)
10172 Humphreys, main belt asteroid 
Humphreys College, Californian college
Humphreys series, spectral line emissions of the hydrogen atom
Humphreys (Unigate), characters featured in a 1970s advertising campaign for milk
USS Humphreys (DD-236), U.S. destroyer
USNS Joshua Humphreys (T-AO-188), U.S. oiler

See also
 Humphrey (disambiguation)